William Beatty (1787April 12, 1851) was a member of the U.S. House of Representatives from Pennsylvania.

William Beatty was born in Stewartstown, County Tyrone in the Kingdom of Ireland in 1787. He immigrated to the United States in 1807 and settled in Butler, Pennsylvania.  He was a sergeant in Captain Thompson's company in the War of 1812.  He served as sheriff of Butler County, Pennsylvania, from 1823 to 1826.

Beatty was elected as a Democrat to the Twenty-fifth and Twenty-sixth Congresses.  He was a member of the Pennsylvania House of Representatives from 1840 to 1842.  He appointed deputy sheriff of Butler County and died in Butler in 1851.  Interment in the Old Butler Cemetery.

References

The Political Graveyard

19th-century Irish people
Democratic Party members of the Pennsylvania House of Representatives
Pennsylvania sheriffs
People from Pennsylvania in the War of 1812
Politicians from County Tyrone
Irish emigrants to the United States (before 1923)
1787 births
1851 deaths
Democratic Party members of the United States House of Representatives from Pennsylvania
Burials in Pennsylvania
19th-century American politicians